Khordeh Qeshlaq (also Romanized as Khordeh Qeshlāq) is a village in Yaft Rural District, Moradlu District, Meshgin Shahr County, Ardabil Province, Iran. At the 2006 census, its population was 21, in 5 families.

References 

Towns and villages in Meshgin Shahr County